The Karachi Football League is a semi-professional football league based in Karachi, Sindh province. It is currently the most popular semi-professional football league in Pakistan. The 40,000-capacity Peoples Football Stadium in Karachi is used for some major games.

History
The Karachi Football League was created by Karachi United and began its inaugural season in 2003–04 as the "All Karachi Clubs League". From 2003–04 until 2008–09, the league was sponsored by "KASB Group of Companies" which was the Title Sponsor of the event for the first six editions. Coca-Cola Pakistan is now the league sponsor.

Format
In 2003-04, the inaugural season saw 10 clubs competing on a single league basis with the famous Lyari based Hyderi Baluch crowned as champions. In the first five seasons, five different clubs won the championship until Shazad Muhammadan won back-to-back titles in 2007-08 and 2008-09 seasons. In the 2008-09 season, the league expanded to 16 clubs, with the top eight clubs competing in a playoff. In 2014-15 season, 20 teams were divided into two groups. After league matches, top four teams from each group progressed into the round-robin Super League phase. The top four teams of the Super League phase then made it to the semi-finals.

Teams

Group A
 Karachi United
 Baloch Mujahid
 Salar Welfare Centre
 Khyber Muslim
 Burma Mohammedan
 Maymar Sports
 Islah Baloch
 FC Rovers
 Young Azizabad
 Irfan Memorial Landhi

Group B
 Azam Sports
 Korangi Baloch Sharafi
 Baloch Youth Malir
 Jam XI Malir
 Maripur Green
 Aga Khan Gymkhana
 Usmanabad Union
 Gulistan Friends Korangi
 Malik Star
 Wasif Memorial

Winners
2003–04: Hyderi Baloch Club
2004–05: Lyari Labour Welfare Centre
2005–06: Young Ansari
2006–07: Karachi United
2007–08: Shahzad Mohammaden
2008–09: Keamari Mohammaden
2009–10: N/A
2010–11: Baloch Youth Garden
2011–12: Burma Mohammedan
2012–13: N/A
2013–14: N/A
2014–15: Burma Mohammedan
2015–16: N/A
2016–17: N/A

See also
 Pakistan Premier League
 Pakistan Football Federation

References

External links
Karachi United FC
2011-12 Karachi Football League standings

Football leagues in Pakistan
2004 establishments in Pakistan